Silvia Parietti (born 19 March 1978) is a road cyclist from Italy. She represented her nation at the 2001, 2003 and 2004 UCI Road World Championships. In 2005, she won the Italian National Road Race Championships.

References

External links
 Profile at Procyclingstats.com

1978 births
Italian female cyclists
Living people
Place of birth missing (living people)
Cyclists from Tuscany
Sportspeople from Livorno